The seventh Annual Pop Corn Music Awards for 1997, at Theatre REX, Athens, Greece. The awards recognized the most popular artists and albums in Greece from the year 1997 as voted by Greek music publication Pop Corn. The event was hosted by Vana Barba and Apostolos Gletsos on March 31, 1998. The Pop Corn Music Awards were discontinued in 2002.

Performances

Winners and nominees

References 

1997
1997 music awards